Shahpour Shahbazi (born 5 June 1961) is an Iranian director, screenwriter, and author.

Biography 
Shahpour Shahbazi immigrated to Germany to continue his studies in cinema.

Graduating from college of the Heidelberg University in Germany, Shahpour Shahbazi continued his studies at the State University of the Visual Arts in Karlsruhe.

Major philosophers from Germany Peter Sloterdijk and Boris Groys in the field of philosophy and professors like Hans Beller and Lothar Spree in the field of cinema were Shahpour Shahbazi’s professors at university.

Shahbazi was admitted to the Karlsruhe University after graduating in Art Research as a doctoral student under the supervision of Professor Boris Groys, a German philosopher.

He is an active member of "Verband der deutschen Filmkritik" (Association of German Film Critics) in Germany and "Anjoman Montaghedan va Nevisandegan Cinemaye Iran" (Iranian Cinema Critics and Writers Association) in Iran.

Awards and honours 

 Receiving the Statue Award for Best Cinematographic Analysis by Iranian Cinema Critics and Writers Association (2017)
 Award and appreciation plot from the Screenwriter's Club for a series of activities in the field of screenwriting (2014)
 Award and honour card Membership in the Iranian Writer’s Club (2014)
 The winner of the Ghalame Zarrin (Golden Pen) for the best cinematic critic writer by Khaneye Cinema (The House of Cinema) (2011)
 The winner of the International Jury’s Special Prize in the 40th International Roshd Festival for his film Pole (The Bridge) in 2010
 Award winner at the German Short Film Festival (1999)
 Winner of the Best Short Film Festival of Gutenberg (1999)

Resume

Filmmaking records

References 

 Introducing the Fifth Cinematic Film Festival" . PanA news agency
 Fourth celebration was held Screenwriters Association" . Hamshahri Online
 The Cultural and Educational Club of Iran Screenwriters Center was opened" . House of Cinema of Iran
 The winners of the Book of the Year Award were introduced" . Khabar Online
 Festival films were praised growth" . Mehr News Agency
 Dialogue with Shahpur Shahbazi, director of the telefilm" bridge " » . Sima Film
 The review of Shahbazi's works was done at the cinema house . " Mehr News Agency
 Playing Movie Silent Butterflies from the Jam Jam" . Telewebion
 a new film to come home network View" . Nasim News
 Movie Silent Butterflies" . Channel 3 IRIB
 Screening of Bridge Bridge from Sima Network 2 – Director Shahpour Shahbazi" . Telewebion

Iranian screenwriters
Iranian filmmakers
1961 births
Living people